Atalanti Island is an island off the western coast of Attica, between Salamis Island and the port of Athens, Piraeus. Anciently, the island was called Atalanta or Atalante (Αταλάντη).

References

Islands of Greece
Landforms of Attica